Suor may refer to:
Suor Angelica, an opera by Puccini 
Suor Emanuelle, a 1977 film
Suor Letizia, "The Awakening" (1956 film)
Suor Prudenza Cambi (d. 1601), Florentine nun artist
Suor Barbara Ragnoni (1448–1533), Italian artist 
Suor Orsola Benincasa University of Naples
Sweat (novel), in 
Suor Uyata,  a range in Yakutia